The men's 800 metres competition at the 2012 Summer Olympics in London, United Kingdom, was held at the Olympic Stadium on 6–9 August. Fifty-five athletes from 43 nations competed. The event was won by David Rudisha of Kenya, the second consecutive and fourth overall title for Kenya in the event. Rudisha would later become the fourth man to successfully defend his Olympic 800 metres title, and the 11th to win two medals of any kind in the event. Nijel Amos' silver medal was the first Olympic medal ever for Botswana.

Summary

Reigning world champion David Rudisha won the race in 1:40.91, becoming the first person to break 1:41 and improving on his own world record (the first world record in an Olympic men's 800m final since 1976). The reigning world junior champion, Nijel Amos, finished second in 1:41.73, establishing a new world junior record and Botswana national record. In an exceptionally fast final, all runners except Abubaker Kaki (who ran a seasonal best) set personal bests, including three national records (Kenya, Botswana, and Ethiopia). The finishing times were the fastest recorded for each placing and it constituted the first time that eight athletes ran under 1:44 in the same race. All the athletes in the race produced times that would have won the final in Beijing.  The eighth-place finisher, Andrew Osagie, produced a time that would have won the gold medal at all but three of the previous Olympic 800m finals.

Rudisha led from the start of the race, easing from lane 4 to the break with a determined Kaki in tow.  By the halfway mark in 49.28 Mohammed Aman lined up off Kaki's shoulder.  During the next 200 meters, Rudisha put a gap on the field and Kaki began falling back.  The scramble was on to see who had anything left or, like Kaki, who would pay the price.  As Rudisha showed the strain of his effort, Nijel Amos and Timothy Kitum started to make up a little of the ground Rudisha had built up.  Running at the back of the field, Duane Solomon and Nick Symmonds made a late run, finishing just a step out of the medals.

Background

This was the 27th appearance of the event, which is one of 12 athletics events to have been held at every Summer Olympics. The only returning finalist from 2008 was silver-medalist Ismail Ahmed Ismail, who had also taken second in the 2011 world championship. 2004 gold medalist, 2008 semifinalist, and 2011 world-championship third-place runner Yuriy Borzakovskiy of Russia competed as well. The clear favorite was David Rudisha of Kenya, the 2011 world champion, world record holder, and #1 ranked runner in 2009, 2010, and 2011.

Cambodia, Iraq, and Mali appeared in the event for the first time. Great Britain made its 26th appearance, most among all nations, having had no competitors in the event only in the 1904 Games in St. Louis.

Qualification

A National Olympic Committee (NOC) could enter up to 3 qualified athletes in the men's 100 metres event if all athletes met the A standard, or 1 athlete if they met the B standard. The maximum number of athletes per nation had been set at 3 since the 1930 Olympic Congress. The qualifying time standards could be obtained in various meets during the qualifying period that had the approval of the IAAF. Indoor and outdoor meets were eligible. The A standard for the 2012 men's 800 metres was 1:45.60; the B standard was 1:46.30. The qualifying period for was from 1 May 2011 to 8 July 2012. NOCs could also have an athlete enter the 800 metres through a universality place. NOCs could enter one male athlete in an athletics event, regardless of time, if they had no male athletes meeting the qualifying A or B standards in any men's athletic event.

Competition format

The competition had seven heats in the first round, three semifinals, and a final. The top three in each of the first round heats progressed, as did the three next fastest runners. The top two finishers in each semifinal race reached the finals along with the two fastest runners outside these runners, to make up the eight finalists.

Records

Prior to the competition, the existing World and Olympic records, and world leading run for the season, were as follows.

The following records were established during the competition:

The following national records were set during the competition.

Schedule

All times are British Summer Time (UTC+1)

Results

Round 1

Qual. rule: first 3 of each heat (Q) plus the 3 fastest times (q) qualified.

Heat 1

Heat 2

Heat 3

Heat 4

Heat 5

Heat 6

Heat 7

Semifinals

Qual. rule: first 2 of each heat (Q) plus the 2 fastest times (q) qualified.

Semifinal 1

Heat 2

Heat 3

Final

 Splits

References

Athletics at the 2012 Summer Olympics
800 metres at the Olympics
Men's events at the 2012 Summer Olympics